A Celebration of New Orleans Music to Benefit MusiCares Hurricane Relief 2005 is a  benefit album, with tracks "from the vault" by an array of New Orleans artists.

A collection of recordings to celebrate New Orleans, moving from second-line brass band music and R&B to modern jazz, Mardi Gras Indian music and gospel, spanning 65 years of recording.

The proceeds will be given to the MusiCares Hurricane Relief Fund, providing assistance to musicians and other music industry people directly affected by Hurricane Katrina.

Track listing

*Liner notes by Branford Marsalis

References

2005 albums
Hurricane Katrina disaster relief charity albums